Lesnovo is a village in Central Western Bulgaria, part of Elin Pelin Municipality, Sofia Province.  it has 1,829 inhabitants. The village came into existence in the 16-17th centuries. Lesnovo has a three-domed Eastern Orthodox church of 'St. Archangel Michael', a rare design in Bulgaria, dating back to the early 20th century; it also features pointed arches. Lesnovo Airport, a small newly-constructed private air strip, located on the South-Easterntern outskirts of the village has compromised the rural peace and quiet of this part of the countryside.

Lesnovo lies in the Eastern Sofia Valley, between the Balkan Mountains to the North and Sredna Gora Mountains to the South-East. The Lesnovo River, a tributary to the Iskar, flows to the North of the village. The village's name is derived from the Russian word 'les' (Russian: лес, meaning 'forest') with the Bulgarian suffix of '-ovo', changed, when Bulgaria was being re-constructed as the spitting image of Russia during all these years of Russian rule from Moscow since the Second World War, from the previous Ottoman name 'Ormanlı' and its Bulgarian version 'Ormanliya', the word 'orman' meaning 'forest' in Turkish, the Ottoman Turks being the rulers of these parts until the tenth consecutive Russo-Turkish war of 1878.

Lesnovo has a community centre ('chitalishte') called 'Immortality' decorated with a monument to the local Bulgarian villagers who died in the 'Great Patriotic', so called, Soviet Communist/Bolshevic War against the Nazis during the Second World War. There is also, a commemorative plaque there on the water fountain in the centre of the village which reads: 'To all those who fell in the struggle against Fascism and Capitalism'. The village boasts a school founded in 1879, too.

Lesnovo Hill in Antarctica is named after the village.

Gallery

External links

Villages in Sofia Province